Just Be Yourself may refer to:

 Just Be Yourself (Jim Mancel song), single by Canadian singer Jim Mancel 1977
 "Just Be Yourself", single by American R&B/funk band Cameo 1982
 Just Be Yoursel, album by Jeff James (musician) 2013
 "Just Be Yourself", single and anime theme by Japanese group The World Standard 2017
 "Just Be Yourself", song by South Korean group Twice from the album Celebrate 2022
Just Be Yourself List of 2001 This American Life episodes
Just Be Yourself  independent short film with Kandyse McClure